Halloy is a commune in the Pas-de-Calais department in the Hauts-de-France region of France.

Geography

Population

Places of interest
 The church of St. Eloi, dating from the nineteenth century.

See also
Communes of the Pas-de-Calais department

References

External links

 Halloy on the Quid website 

Communes of Pas-de-Calais